The 2011 Sicilia Classic was a professional tennis tournament played on clay courts. It was the third edition of the tournament which was part of the 2011 ATP Challenger Tour. It took place in Palermo, Italy between 3 and 9 October 2011.

ATP entrants

Seeds

 1 Rankings are as of September 26, 2011.

Other entrants
The following players received wildcards into the singles main draw:
  Marco Cecchinato
  Antonio Comporto
  Thomas Muster
  Gianluca Naso

The following players received entry as a special exempt into the singles main draw:
  Alessandro Giannessi

The following players received entry from the qualifying draw:
  Pavol Červenák
  Javier Martí
  Andrés Molteni
  Diego Schwartzman

Champions

Singles

 Carlos Berlocq def.  Adrian Ungur, 6–1, 6–1

Doubles

 Tomasz Bednarek /  Mateusz Kowalczyk def.  Aliaksandr Bury /  Andrei Vasilevski, 6–2, 6–4

External links
Official Website
ITF Search
ATP official site

Sicilia Classic
Clay court tennis tournaments
Sicilia Classic